Variation Selectors Supplement is a Unicode block containing additional Variation Selectors beyond those found in the Variation Selectors block.

These combining characters are named variation selector-17 (for U+E0100) through to variation selector-256 (U+E01EF), abbreviated VS17 – VS256.

, VS17 (U+E0100) to VS48 (U+E011F) are used in ideographic variation sequences in the Unicode Ideographic Variation Database (IVD). These selectors are known as Ideographic Variation Selectors (IVS). They are not listed in the list of standardized variation sequence, instead they are listed in another Ideographic Variation Database.

History
The following Unicode-related documents record the purpose and process of defining specific characters in the Variation Selectors Supplement block:

References 

Unicode blocks